Christopher John Auchinvole  (born 7 March 1945) is a New Zealand politician. He represented the National Party in the House of Representatives from 2005 to 2014.

Early years
Auchinvole was born in Prestwick, Ayrshire, Scotland, on 7 March 1945, and attended the Royal Military Academy at Sandhurst in England. He later moved to New Zealand and became a naturalised New Zealander in 1980. In New Zealand he has been involved with the export industry, and operated a company based on the West Coast. He has also been involved in the Uniting Church, becoming a lay preacher.

Member of Parliament

In the 2005 election, Auchinvole stood as the National Party's candidate for the West Coast-Tasman electorate. Despite reducing the incumbent's majority by 5,568 votes, he was unsuccessful. Nevertheless, he entered Parliament as a list MP, having been ranked 34th. In the 2008 election, Auchinvole won the electorate with a small majority beating Labour's Damien O'Connor who had represented the West Coast since . Damien O'Connor regained the electorate in 2011 despite a record defeat for the Labour Party.

Auchinvole is a wedding celebrant, and officiated at the wedding in Parliament of fellow MP Tau Henare on 7 March 2012. He was a strong supporter of the Marriage (Definition of Marriage) Amendment Bill which sought to legalise same-sex marriage in New Zealand. His speech in support of the bill during its second reading was well received.

Retirement

On 2 October 2013 Auchinvole confirmed that he would be stepping down at the 2014 election. Auchinvole was replaced for the 2014 election by Maureen Pugh, Former Westland District Mayor as the West Coast-Tasman Candidate however she did not win the seat but later entered Parliament on the list following Tim Groser's resignation. Following the 2014 election Auchinvole has retired with his wife to raise Highland Cattle on their West Coast properties in Moana near Lake Brunner on the West Coast.

References

External links
Chris Auchinvole MP official site
Profile at National party

1945 births
Living people
New Zealand National Party MPs
People from Prestwick
Scottish emigrants to New Zealand
People from the West Coast, New Zealand
New Zealand list MPs
New Zealand MPs for South Island electorates
Members of the New Zealand House of Representatives
21st-century New Zealand politicians
New Zealand justices of the peace
Naturalised citizens of New Zealand